Olearia fluvialis is a species of flowering plant in the family Asteraceae and is endemic to inland areas of northern Western Australia. It is a shrub with scattered, narrowly egg-shaped leaves, and white or mauve and yellow, daisy-like inflorescences.

Description
Its stems and leaves are covered with minute glandular hairs. Flowering occurs in April or May and the fruit is a pale brown, silky-hairy achene, the pappus with 16 to 25 long bristles and a smaller number of much shorter ones.

Taxonomy
Olearia fluvialis was first formally described in 1990 by Nicholas Sèan Lander in the journal Nuytsia from specimens collected near the "Fortesque River [by] W. Cussock" (possibly Fortescue River by William Henry Cusack) in 1895. The specific epithet (fluvialis) refers to the riverine habitat preference of this species.

Distribution and habitat
Olearia fluvialis grows in stony creek beds in the  Murchison and Pilbara biogeographic regions of northern Western Australia.

Conservation status
This daisy bush is listed as "not threatened" by the Department of Biodiversity, Conservation and Attractions.

References

fluvialis
Flora of Western Australia
Plants described in 1990